"For You I Will (Confidence)" is the debut single of American singer-songwriter Teddy Geiger, featured on her debut album Underage Thinking. The song was used as the theme song for the CBS comedy-drama series Love Monkey, on which Geiger played a recurring guest role. The song became a hit despite the show's cancellation and reached number 29 on the Billboard Hot 100.

Song information
The song describes being in love with someone who is unaware of one’s existence and finding the confidence to overcome that obstacle.

Release
The song can also be found on her 2005 EP Step Ladder under the name "Confidence". The EP version was released on September 6, 2005, but did not receive much airplay then.

Later, the song was re-released in January 2006, in a version that was used as the theme song for Love Monkey and later appeared on Geiger's Underage Thinking album. This "single version" added a stronger folk rock influence and reached number 29 on the Billboard Hot 100.

A CD single was released on June 27, 2006, in Australia and New Zealand, containing the single version of the "For You I Will (Confidence)" song, the B-side "Do You Even Care?", and the music video for the single.

Music video
In the music video, a street-performing musician (Geiger) becomes enamored of a girl (Laguna Beachs Kristin Cavallari) who has a boyfriend.  Later, Geiger performs at a poolside party attended by Cavallari and her boyfriend.  Cavallari strips to her underwear and jumps into the water.  Many partygoers then jump in fully clothed, as does Geiger.  Geiger and Cavallari kiss as they come up for air.  Geiger finishes a studio recording session, and Cavallari wakes from a nap on a nearby couch.

Track listingsDigital download (February 2006)
"For You I Will (Confidence)" – 3:49CD single' (June 2006)
"For You I Will (Confidence)" – 3:48
"Do You Even Care?" – 3:54
"For You I Will (Confidence)" [Video] – 3:53

Charts

Weekly charts

Year-end charts

Certifications

References

External links
 

2006 debut singles
Teddy Geiger songs
Songs written by Billy Mann
Music videos directed by Scott Speer
2006 songs
Songs written by Teddy Geiger
Columbia Records singles